Immaculate Conception Catholic Church & Immaculata Catholic School are a Catholic parish church and parochial school run by the Order of Friars Minor in downtown Durham, North Carolina. The church and school are located in the Burch Avenue Historic District. Immaculate Conception is the oldest Catholic congregation in Durham, and the affiliated school was the city's first Catholic school. In 2019 and 2022, the church and school were accused of discriminating against LGBT people.

Church 
The Catholic community in Durham formed in 1867, when a group of Catholics from Lockhaven, Pennsylvania settled on land in the area. 

Prior to the construction of the first church building, Catholics in Durham celebrated mass with visiting priests from Raleigh and Newton Grove at the William Thomas O'Brien House and at the home of James Lawrence. The O'Brien family were an affluent Catholic family connected to the  W. Duke Sons & Company. Later, a space was rented in J.R. Gooch's store on Corcoran Street which led to protests because laws prevented liquor from being sold in close proximity to a church. In 1896, Abbot Leo Haid of Belmont Abbey, the Vicar Apostolic of North Carolina, asked Benjamin Newton Duke for financial assistance to build a church, but Duke declined. Later that year, Fr. Prendergast of Raleigh was celebrating mass at the Durham YMCA.

The first church, a white wooden church named St. Mary's, was built in 1906 on West Chapel Hill Street, located on land once owned by William T. O'Brien. A parochial school was established in 1909. The church was consecrated on January 14, 1906 with 106 members.

School 
The first school, called St. Mary's School, was built adjacent to the sanctuary on Chapel Hill Street. The school was founded in 1909 by Fr. Francis O'Brien and the Sisters of St. Dominic from Newburgh, New York. St. Mary's enrollment started with nine students and ended with twnety-three in its first year. The school building was town down and a new building was constructed in the 1951. The school was later renamed St. William's School and, finally, Immaculata School.

In 2012, the U.S. Department of Education designated Immaculata Catholic School as a national blue ribbon school for academic achievements. In 2019, the school received a national green ribbon school award from the department of education for efforts to reduce environmental impact. The school was the first in North Carolina to receive AdvancED STEM certification.

Notable alumni 
 Vernetta Alston, American politician and member of the North Carolina House of Representatives

Discrimination against LGBT people 
Despite being listed as an LGBT-friendly parish on the Durham County website and by New Ways Ministry, and hosting an LGBTQ ministry group, the parish has been the subject of controversy regarding discrimination against LGBT people.

In February 2019, Immaculata Catholic School alumnae and Durham City Councilwoman Vernetta Alston and Durham Mayor Protempore Jillian Johnson were disinvited from speaking at Immaculata for a Black History Month celebration. Alston and Johnson were originally invited by the school's African-American Heritage Committee as part of the school's "Influential African American Women" theme. The invitation was rescinded after there were threats to protest the event due to Alston and Johnson being openly gay public officials. Fr. Christopher VanHaight, the pastor at Immaculate Conception Catholic Church and Head of Immaculata Catholic School, said he made the decision to rescind the invitation and close the school for a day after receiving messages from some school parents voicing concern about having a "pro-gay marriage" politician speak at the school, claiming that Alston speaking would "question the school's commitment to upholding Catholic moral teaching." He also stated that the school "needed a break from politicians." Fr. VanHaight's decision was supported by Bishop Luis R. Zarama and the Diocese of Raleigh.

In May 2022, a transgender woman, Wilhelmina Indermaur, was hired by a family to serve as an in-school aide for their disabled child. Indermaur, who already was employed as a nanny for another family whose children attend the school, was active in the school community and often attended mass at the church. In June 2022, Fr. Jacek Orzechowski, the pastor at Immaculate Conception, called a meeting between school administration, clerical staff, and the family to announce that Indermaur would not be allowed to work on Immaculata's campus because she is transgender. The day before Indermaur was informed of the school's decision, the church posted Pride Month posts on their social media accounts with the caption, "Immaculate Conception welcomes members of the LGBTQ community." The church and school's decision ultimately left Indermaur without a job.

Notable clergy 
 Casey Cole, Catholic priest, Franciscan friar, and internet celebrity

References 

Churches in Durham, North Carolina
Franciscan churches in the United States
LGBT and Catholicism
LGBT in North Carolina
LGBT-related controversies in the United States
Persecution of LGBT people in the United States
Roman Catholic churches completed in 1906
Roman Catholic churches in North Carolina
Roman Catholic Diocese of Raleigh